German submarine U-242 was a Type VIIC U-boat of Nazi Germany's Kriegsmarine during World War II.

The submarine was laid down on 30 September 1942 at the Friedrich Krupp Germaniawerft yard at Kiel as yard number 676, launched on 20 July 1943 and commissioned on 14 August under the command of Oberleutnant zur See Karl-Wilhelm Pancke.

After training with the 5th U-boat Flotilla at Kiel, she went to the 3rd flotilla to work operationally from 1 June 1944. She then returned to the 5th flotilla on 6 July and moved to the 8th flotilla for operations on 1 August. She was reassigned to the 5th flotilla a third time from 16 February 1945.

In seven patrols, U-242 sank two ships totalling  and an auxiliary warship of 500 GRT.

She was sunk by a mine in the St. George's Channel on 5 April 1945.

Design
German Type VIIC submarines were preceded by the shorter Type VIIB submarines. U-242 had a displacement of  when at the surface and  while submerged. She had two shafts and two  propellers.

U-242 was fitted with five  torpedo tubes (four fitted at the bow and one at the stern), fourteen torpedoes, one  SK C/35 naval gun, (220 rounds), one  Flak M42 and two twin  C/30 anti-aircraft guns. The boat had a complement of between forty-four and sixty.

Service history

First patrol
U-242s first patrol, like most of the others, was carried out in Norwegian and Baltic waters. She had already made the short voyage from Kiel to Stavanger in Norway in May 1944; her first patrol proper started from the Norwegian port and terminated in Bergen, also in Norway. She then spent some time shuttling between Bergen, Stavanger, Kristiansand, Kiel, Reval (also known as Tallinn in Estonia), and Helsinki in Finland.

Second patrol
The boat's second foray was similar to the first, a series of short 'jabs' from Helsinki and Grand Hotel.

Third patrol
U-242 sank the Soviet barge VRD-96 Del'fin and the survey ship KKO-2 on 25 August 1944; one day before returning to Helsinki.

Fourth, fifth and sixth patrols
More round-robin journeys were carried out, travelling between Paldiski (known to the Germans as Baltisch Port), Windau in Latvia (now known as Ventspils), Pillau (Baltiysk), Danzig (Gdańsk in modern Poland), Horten Naval Base in Norway and Kristiansand. It was during her fifth patrol that the Finnish ship, the Rigel, was sunk on 28 October 1944 by a mine laid by U-242 on 21 September.

Seventh patrol and loss
For her seventh sortie, she was sent to the waters off southwest Britain. On 5 April 1945, she struck a mine in the St. Georges Channel (between southeast Ireland and Wales), off St. David's Head. Forty-four men died; there were no survivors.

Summary of raiding history

References

Notes

Citations

Bibliography

External links

German Type VIIC submarines
World War II submarines of Germany
U-boats commissioned in 1943
U-boats sunk in 1945
1943 ships
Ships built in Kiel
Ships lost with all hands
U-boats sunk by mines
Maritime incidents in April 1945